This is a listing of various types of charges leveled against the Liberation Tigers of Tamil Eelam (LTTE) by relevant state actors and agencies.

One factor that has greatly benefited the LTTE has been its sophisticated international support network. While some of the funding obtained by the LTTE is from legitimate fundraising, a significant portion is obtained through criminal activities, extortion among Tamil diaspora, involving sea piracy, human trafficking , drug trafficking and gunrunning.

Sea piracy 

The LTTE has been accused of hijacking 4 Sri Lankan supply ships in the waters of Sri Lanka, including Irish Mona (in August 1995), Misen (in July 1997), Morong Bong (in July 1997) and Princess Kash (in August 1998).  The MV Sik Yang, a 2,818-ton Malaysian-flag cargo ship which sailed from Tuticorin, India on 25 May 1999, went missing in waters near Sri Lanka. The fate of the ship's crew of 15 is unknown. A report published on June 30, 1999 states that the vessel "may have been" captured by the LTTE as it went missing in the waters of Sri Lanka, according to 'Anti-Shipping Activity Messages'.

Likewise, the crew of a Jordanian ship, MV Farah III in December 2006, that ran aground near LTTE-controlled territory off the island's coast, accused the Tamil Tigers of risking their lives and forcing them to abandon the vessel which was carrying 14,000 tons of Indian rice. Also they were accused of stripping off the equipment from it.

Arms smuggling 

The LTTE members operated a cargo company called "Otharad Cargo" in the United Arab Emirates. There are reports that the LTTE met Taliban members and discussed the "Sharjah network", which existed in the Sharjah emirate of the United Arab Emirates. The Sharjah network was used by Victor Bout, an arms-smuggling Russian intelligence agent, to provide the Taliban with weapons deliveries and other flights between Sharjah and Kandahar. Otharad Cargo reportedly received several consignments of military hardware from the Sharjah network.

The Mackenzie Institute claimed that LTTE's secretive international operations of the smuggling of weapons, explosives, and "dual use" technologies is attributed to the "KP Branch", headed by Selvarasa Pathmanathan prior to 2002. It also claims that the most expertly executed operation of the KP Branch was the theft of 32,400 rounds of 81 mm mortar ammunition purchased from Tanzania destined for the Sri Lanka Army. Being aware of the purchase of 35,000 mortar bombs, the LTTE made a bid to the manufacturer through a numbered company and arranged a vessel of their own to pick up the load. Once the bombs were loaded into the ship, the LTTE changed the name and registration of their ship. The vessel was taken to Tiger-held territory in Sri Lanka's north instead of transporting it to its intended destination. In 2002, Prabhakaran appointed Castro as the international chief of LTTE. He overtook the responsibilities of arms smuggling and related activities from Pathmanathan.

Extortion 
LTTE had coerced Sri Lankan Tamil diaspora and Tamil civilians in Sri Lanka to give it money, by threatening the safety of their relatives or property in areas under its control.

Money laundering 
In 2008–2009, a report on ″Money laundering and the financing of terrorism″ to the European Union Committee stated a case study related to the LTTE which evidenced the implantation of this terrorist group in number of EU member states. In January 2011, Swiss authorities arrested several LTTE members on money laundering. The Swiss Federal Criminal Court has given no prison terms to alleged financiers of the LTTE. It said the 13 accused were either given suspended custodial sentences or acquitted. In December 2019, the Federal Supreme Court of Switzerland upheld the 2018 ruling, stating that the hierarchical link with the World Tamil Coordinating Committee "could not be sufficiently established" and that the LTTE is not a criminal group, "even if" it had committed acts of terror.

Passport forgery 
In the early 1990s, Canadian authorities uncovered a passport forgery scheme run by Canadian Tamils with links to the LTTE, including one of its founding members. In December 2010, Spanish and Thai police uncovered another passport forgery scheme attributed to LTTE. Counter terrorism expert Aaron Mannes stated that LTTE supplied forged passports to Ramzi Yousef, who bombed the World Trade Center.

Drug trafficking 
A number of intelligence agencies have accused LTTE of involvement in drug trafficking. In 2010, citing Royal Canadian Mounted Police sources, Jane's Intelligence Review said the LTTE controls a portion of the one billion dollar drug market in Montreal, Quebec. It also states narcotics smuggling using its merchant ships, is one of the main ways of earning money out of its $300 million annual income. The U.S. Department of Justice states that LTTE has historically served as the drug couriers moving narcotics into Europe. Indian authorities accused LTTE operatives of previously bringing narcotics to Mumbai from Mandsaur District of Madhya Pradesh, Rajasthan and Punjab border. The drugs were then transported to coastal towns in Tamil Nadu such as Tuticorin, Rameswaram, Ramanathapuram, Nagapattinam and Kochi, in Kerala State.

Credit card fraud 
LTTE was also involved in credit card fraud, in the United Kingdom. In 2010, STF arrested the mastermind behind this fraud, Neshanadan Muruganandan alias Anandan. LTTE had cloned credit cards using PIN and card numbers obtained from unsuspecting card holders in the United Kingdom, and funds were later transferred out of their accounts. In 2007, Norwegian authorities sentenced six LTTE members for skimming more than 5.3 million Norwegian kroner in a similar credit card scam.

Cyber attacks 
In August 1997, an organisation calling themselves the Internet Black Tigers claimed responsibility for the E-mail harassment of various Sri Lankan networks around the world. The group sent mass Emails which contained the text "We are the Internet Black Tigers and we're doing this to disrupt your communications". They were also responsible for repeated attacks on official sites of numerous other governments.  The LTTE is also accused of having pioneered online fund raising through solicitation and various cyber crimes including identity theft and credit card fraud.

LTTE is also known to use the internet for criminal profit. In such an attack on Sheffield University's computer system they were able to capture legitimate user IDs and passwords of well respected academics and to use them for propaganda and fund raising in a covert manner.

See also 
 Affiliates to the Liberation Tigers of Tamil Eelam
 Alleged war crimes during the final stages of the Sri Lankan Civil War

Notes

References 

Liberation Tigers of Tamil Eelam